George Gilmer may refer to:

 George Gilmer Sr. (1700–1757), mayor of Williamsburg, Virginia
 George Rockingham Gilmer (1790–1859), American statesman and politician in Georgia

See also
George Gilmore (1898–1985), Protestant IRA leader
George Crosby Gilmore (1860–1937), Australian politician
George Gilmour (1900–1963), academic